The following works deal with the cultural, political, economic, military, biographical and geologic history of pre-territorial Wyoming, Wyoming Territory and the State of Wyoming.

Surveys of Wyoming history
 
 
 
 Cassity, Michael. Lives Worth Living, History Worth Preserving Wyoming: A Brief History of Wyoming 1860 - 1960 (2010) 
 
 
 

Dick, Everett. Vanguards of the Frontier: A Social History of the Northern Plains and Rocky Mountains from the Earliest White Contacts to the Coming of the Homemaker (1941) online
 
 
 Writers' Program of the Work Projects Administration in the State of Wyoming. Wyoming, a Guide to Its History, Highways, and People (1940) online famous WPA guide

Historic expeditions

Cook, Folsom, Peterson Expedition (1869)

Washburn, Langford, Doane Expedition (1870)

Hayden Geological Survey (1871)

Business, economy and labor
 Cassity, Michael. Wyoming Will Be Your New Home: Ranching, Farming, and Homesteading in Wyoming, 1860–1960 (Cheyenne: Wyoming State Parks and Cultural Resources, 2011) 342 pp. 
 Cassity, Michael. Building Up Wyoming: Depression-Era Federal Projects in Wyoming, 1929-1943 (Wyoming State Historic Preservation Office, 2013)

Indians
 
 Hoebel, E. Adamson. The Cheyennes: Indians of the Great Plains (1978)
 Lowie, Robert H. The Crow Indians (U. of Nebraska Press, 1983)

Military histories

 
 
 Fifer, Barbara. Montana Battlefields 1806-1877: Native Americans And the U.S. Army at War (2005)  excerpt and text search

Primary sources

Local and regional histories

Law and order

Ghost towns

Primary sources

Biographies
 Chamblin, Thomas S. ed. Historical encyclopedia of Wyoming (2 vol Wyoming Historical Institute, 1954) ;  952 biographies in 1040 pages.

Memoirs and primary sources

Political histories

Culture

Social history

Geology

Journals
 Annals of Wyoming: The Wyoming History Journal Wyoming State Historical Society in association with the Department of History, University of Wyoming. Published as the Quarterly Bulletin (1923–1925), Annals of Wyoming (1925–1993), Wyoming Annals (1993–1995) and Wyoming History Journal (1995–1996). Index

Bibliographies

See also

History of Wyoming#Further reading
Bibliography of Yellowstone National Park

Notes

History of Wyoming
Bibliographies of the United States and territories
Bibliographies of history